The Taipa River is a river of the northern Northland Region of New Zealand's North Island. It flows west then north, reaching the south of Doubtless Bay at the township of Taipa.

See also
List of rivers of New Zealand

References

Far North District
Rivers of the Northland Region
Rivers of New Zealand